Thomas James Awerkamp (May 23, 1923 – July 2, 1992) was an American businessman and politician.

Born in Quincy, Illinois, Awerkamp served in the United States Army Air Forces during World War II. He worked in the real estate business in Quincy, Illinois. He served on the Adams County, Illinois Board of Commissioners and was a Democrat. Awerkamp served in the Illinois Senate from 1969 to 1969. Awerkamp died at a hospital in Keokuk, Iowa.

Notes

External links

1923 births
1992 deaths
People from Quincy, Illinois
United States Army Air Forces personnel of World War II
Military personnel from Illinois
Businesspeople from Illinois
County commissioners in Illinois
Democratic Party Illinois state senators
20th-century American politicians
20th-century American businesspeople